Little Bogue is a stream in the U.S. state of Mississippi.

Little Bogue is a name partially derived from the Choctaw language meaning "little creek". Variant names are "East Fork Batupah Bogue", "East Fork Bogue Creek", and "Little Bogue Creek".

References

Rivers of Mississippi
Rivers of Grenada County, Mississippi
Rivers of Montgomery County, Mississippi
Rivers of Webster County, Mississippi
Mississippi placenames of Native American origin